The Black Rock Range is a mountain range in northwestern Nevada. It is named for Black Rock Point, which is located at the southern end of the range. The Black Rock Range divides the Black Rock Desert into eastern and western arms.

The majority of the range is part of the Black Rock Desert-High Rock Canyon Emigrant Trails National Conservation Area.  In addition two separate federally designated wilderness areas are part of the Black Rock Range.  Those wilderness areas are Pahute Peak Wilderness and the North Black Rock Range Wilderness.

In December 2009, the Bureau of Land Management announced a roundup of 2500 wild horses out of an estimated population of 3000 in the Black Rock Range and vicinity, due to overpopulation.

References

External links 
 
 Washoe County Trail Guide: Black Rock Point at Reno Gazette-Journal
 41N-119W Confluence Point - 41 degrees north latitude and 119 degrees west longitude, located at the base of the Black Rock Range

Mountain ranges of Humboldt County, Nevada
Mountain ranges of Nevada